Melissa Margaret Peterman is an American actress and comedian. She has played the role of Barbra Jean in the television comedy series Reba, appeared as Bonnie Wheeler in the ABC Family/Freeform series Baby Daddy, and was host of ABC Family's Dancing Fools, ABC's Bet on Your Baby, and CMT's The Singing Bee.  Since 2017, she has played Brenda Sparks in The Big Bang Theory spinoff series Young Sheldon.  Since August 2022, she is the host of the television game show Person, Place, or Thing on the Fox network.

Life and career

Early life
Peterman was born in Edina, Minnesota, and grew up in nearby Burnsville. After graduating from Burnsville High School, she attended Minnesota State University, Mankato where she majored in theater.

1996–2000: Career launch
Upon graduating from Minnesota State, Peterman was cast as Madeline Monroe in Hey City Theater's production of Tony n' Tina's Wedding. After more than 600 performances, she went on to write and perform at Brave New Workshop, the improvisational comedy theatre in Minneapolis. The theater boasts such alumni as Pat Proft, Louie Anderson, Cedric Yarbrough, Mo Collins, and Al Franken. While with the Brave New Workshop, she also performed at the Chicago Improv Festival and the Big Stink Comedy Festival in Austin, Texas.

In 1996, Peterman made her film debut as "Hooker #2" in the Oscar-winning Coen brothers' movie Fargo.

2001–06: Reba and other appearances
In 2001, Peterman was cast as Barbra Jean Booker-Hart in Reba opposite country music star Reba McEntire and television veteran Christopher Rich. The show was the most-watched comedy on The WB in its debut season. In 2007, the show ended its run after six seasons. Episodes continue to air in syndication on multiple networks.

During this time, Peterman also returned to film with Recipe for Disaster alongside Lesley Ann Warren and John Larroquette. She also made appearances in How High and the unreleased independent film Cook-Off. Peterman remained loyal to her comic roots, too, as the host of 15 Minutes of Fem, a comedy showcase for women presented at the Egyptian Theatre. On television, she appeared in the Oxygen sketch comedy show Running with Scissors and guest-starred on Just Shoot Me! and The Pitts. She also portrayed an unstable guidance counselor, Mrs. Splitz, on Ned's Declassified School Survival Guide.

During her summer hiatus from Reba, Peterman hosted The Sound of Music Sing-a-Long, reprising her hosting gig the previous summer's The Wizard of Oz Sing-a-Long, at the Hollywood Bowl in Los Angeles. Peterman also made appearances on the World Cup Comedy Challenge television series, as well as on the celebrity edition of Trading Spaces, with her Reba co-star Christopher Rich.

2007–10: Tours, pilots, and The Singing Bee

In October, ABC announced Peterman had been cast in an untitled comedy pilot starring Cedric the Entertainer. The show was taped before an audience on October 30, 2007. In December, the network announced they had secured the actors, indicating they were interested in the project. During the annual upfront presentation on May 13, 2008, ABC confirmed they did not order the pilot to series.

In 2007, Peterman appeared as the opening act on country singer and former Reba co-star Reba McEntire's tour. Peterman returned the following year when McEntire toured with Kelly Clarkson. She was also the opening act for the second leg of the tour in 2008.

In 2007, Peterman hosted Comedy Stage for CMT. The series finished its run after eight episodes. The next year, she hosted a special, Redneck Dreams, for the network. Also in 2008, she was in two episodes of Wanna Bet? as a celebrity panelist. Peterman also appeared in an episode of animated comedy 
American Dad!. She announced she was shooting another comedy, this time for FOX, titled Living With Abandon. The pilot was not ordered to series.

In 2009, she landed the hosting gig for The Singing Bee. The show had been cancelled by NBC, and CMT expressed interest in reviving the competition. Also in 2009, Peterman appeared in Rita Rocks on Lifetime, and in Surviving Suburbia on ABC. She starred opposite Gary Valentine in Dusty Peacock, an online comedy series on Crackle.

In February 2010, Big Machine Records announced that they signed Peterman to a recording contract, and she was to release her debut comedy album that year. The album has been recorded, but has not yet been released. Peterman is no longer listed on the record label website. Her debut comedy special, Melissa Peterman: Am I The Only One?, premiered March 12, 2010 on CMT. The special was taped before an audience in Nashville, Tennessee. Also that year, Peterman hosted the CMT Music Awards red carpet.

2011: Working Class
Peterman had revealed, in 2010, she was starring in another pilot. The family sitcom, titled Working Class, was the first original scripted comedy for the CMT network. Peterman starred alongside comedy veteran Ed Asner and renowned television actor Patrick Fabian. The series debut was the most-watched and highest-rated in network history. The series was canceled after one season.

2012–22: Baby Daddy, Young Sheldon, and other shows

In 2012, Peterman announced she was appearing in an upcoming ABC Family sitcom, Baby Daddy. In March, the network announced Peterman, originally only appearing in one episode, had been upgraded to series regular. The network also revealed the pilot was the highest-testing comedy pilot in network history. Baby Daddy finished its season as the highest-rated comedy in key demographics. The show has been renewed for a second season, returning Wednesday, May 29. The show ended on May 22, 2017, after six seasons.

In January 2013, ABC ordered Bet On Your Baby and announced Peterman was the host. The competition series debuts Saturday, April 6. In February 2013, ABC Family announced Peterman was also the host of another upcoming competition, Dancing Fools. 

Peterman also guest starred on Last Man Standing as CeCe in Season 8.

Since 2017, Peterman has played Brenda Sparks, a recurring character on the Fox Network show, Young Sheldon.  Originally married to Herschel Sparks (Billy Gardell) in seasons 1 and 2, Peterman's character becomes the divorced and single mom next door neighbor to the Cooper family in season 4 and is at times a friend and nemesis to Mary Cooper, played by Zoe Perry.  In seasons 4 and 5, Brenda Sparks and George Cooper (Lance Barber) experience a closer relationship that culminates at the end season 5 with Brenda propositioning George.

Beginning in 2019, Peterman hosted the comedy game show Punch Line, where two teams of comedians try to supply punchlines to various headlines. She has also been a recurring guest star on the syndicated game show 25 Words or Less.

In 2020, Peterman began co-hosting with her former Reba co-star Reba McEntire on a new podcast titled Living & Learning.

Beginning in August 2022, Peterman is the host of TV game show Person, Place, or Thing on the Fox network.

Personal life
Peterman works with The Unusual Suspects Theatre Company, a non-profit organization helping at-risk youth in the Los Angeles area. She has a son.

Filmography

References

External links
 
 Melissa Peterman cast bio on The WB

Living people
American game show hosts
American television actresses
American film actresses
American stage actresses
Actresses from Minneapolis
Big Machine Records artists
People from Burnsville, Minnesota
Year of birth missing (living people)